Mathilde Verne (née Würm; 25 May 1865 – 4 June 1936) was an English pianist and teacher, of German descent. Along with most of her other sisters, Mathilde changed her surname to Verne in 1893 after the death of their father, John Wurm.

Life and career
She was born as Mathilde Würm in Southampton, England, the fourth of ten children. After studying for four years under Clara Schumann in Frankfurt, she became established as a concert pianist in 1887, as well as launching a career as music teacher. She taught briefly at the Royal College of Music, and later made regular appearances under Henry Wood at the Queen's Hall Promenade Concerts, being strongly associated with the "Tuesday 12 O'Clock Concerts" of chamber music, from 1907 until her death in 1936. Her sisters were Adela Verne, Alice Verne-Bredt and Mary Wurm. 
 
She made her debut in St James's Hall in London, playing a Mendelssohn piano trio. She frequently appeared as soloist under such conductors as Arthur Nikisch, Hans Richter, Sir August Manns, and Sir Henry J. Wood. She twice visited the United States, playing under Theodore Thomas. She became especially famous for her authentic playing of the works of Robert Schumann. Her pupils, aside from her sister, Adela, and her nephew, John Vallier, included Solomon; Dame Moura Lympany, Harold Samuel, Herbert Menges and Lady Elizabeth Bowes-Lyon (the future Queen Elizabeth, HM The Queen Mother). She died in London surrounded by musician friends, at a party at the Savoy to launch her book ' Chords of Remembrance, ' in 1936.

See also
 Alice Verne-Bredt
 Mary Wurm

References

External links
Lympany biodata
Keyboardgiants.com

1865 births
1936 deaths
English people of German descent
Musicians from Southampton
English classical pianists
English women pianists
Robert Schumann
Musicians from London
19th-century classical pianists
20th-century classical pianists
Academics of the Royal College of Music
19th-century English musicians
20th-century English women musicians
19th-century British women musicians
Women classical pianists
19th-century women pianists
20th-century women pianists